The Catholic Church in North America refers to the Catholic Church in North America, in full communion with the Holy See in Rome, including its various geographical coverage on the continent. It is prevalent in many different countries, on the mainland and in both island countries and overseas territories, such as the United States, the Dominican Republic, and El Salvador.

Social and cultural issues 
The Catholic Church has begun grouping “North” America with “Latin” and “Central” America as one America. Pope Paul VI was the first Pope to visit the Americas on October 4, 1965. He broke the tradition of treating the Americas separately but rather as one with common issues. These issues include extreme wage gaps, immigration, drug trafficking, human rights, consumerism, and secular thinking. The main issue at stake for the Catholic Church, found across the Americas including New York, São Paulo, and Mexico City, is the loss of Catholic faith. What was once a thriving Catholic region is now endangered by present-day culture and religions originating in the United States, including the Jehovah's Witness, Mormonism, and Protestant evangelical churches. These religions are influencing Mexico and are making their way to the Latin American countries.

Papal visits to North America 

On October 4, 1965, Pope Paul VI visited New York City for 13.5 hours, becoming the first Pontiff in the Western Hemisphere. During his visit he gave a 35-minute address on disarmament in the nuclear age, quoting the first Catholic President of the United States, John F. Kennedy. He visited President Lyndon Johnson for 46 minutes at the Waldorf Astoria hotel. He visited St. Patrick's Cathedral and a church near the United Nations. Starting in Queens, going through Harlem, and eventually down Fifth Avenue in Manhattan, he made a 25-mile procession greeting millions. He ended his visit with 90,000 worshipers celebrating Mass at Yankee Stadium. He finished his trip viewing Michelangelo's Pietà at the World's Fair in Queens. It is estimated he was seen in person by one million people and on television by 100 million.

In October 1979, Pope John Paul II went to America on his first of seven trips. He started in Boston and went to New York, where at the United Nations he advocated for human rights for all, especially Palestinian Arabs. He spent two days in New York, finishing with 80,000 congregants by celebrating mass at the Yankee Stadium reminding individuals of the "urgent need" to aid the poor. He then met with President Jimmy Carter, becoming the first Pope to enter the White House. He made an address on the South Lawn to 100,000 guests where he spoke on limiting nuclear weapons and against abortion.

Pope John Paul II, known as the first Pope to truly travel to different nations, took a pilgrimage to the Americas to focus on a "reconquest". During the Pope's visit to the Americas he wanted to focus on Mexico as the bridge between the different nations as the majority would soon no longer be Catholic. He made seven trips over two decades in an attempt to prevent Catholics from converting to other religions or to avert growing secularization. During the Pope's fourth trip to Mexico he delivered the conclusions on the November 1997 synod on "America".

Present times 
The Vatican holds North America as a crucial aspect to the Catholic Church as it is the world's superpower made up of mass international culture and a large population of Catholics. Mexico is the second-largest Catholic nation. In hopes of reversing the cultural influences of the United States in order to maintain the current level of Catholicity, the Church is sending what many call confusing signals. It is using modern mass marketing in an ad campaign that promotes the Pope's visits but condemns much of modern society. The mass communication efforts of the Church to North American through intense publicity reflects the hardships the church is going through with secular thinking and represents the efforts it is willing to make to spread the word of Christ in a modern form.

See also
 Ecclesiastical property in the United States
 List of American saints and beatified people
 List of Canadian Roman Catholic saints
 List of Mexican Saints
 List of Central American and Caribbean Saints
 List of saints of the Canary Islands

References